The 2023 British Cycling National Track Championships were a series of track cycling competitions. The National Track Championships (excluding certain events) were held from 26 to 29 January 2023 at the Geraint Thomas National Velodrome in Newport, Wales. They are organised and sanctioned by British Cycling, and are open to British cyclists.

Emma Finucane was the star of the Championships after winning four gold medals across the disciplines.

The Derny, Omnium, Madison, Tandem and Elimination events take place at various other dates throughout the year.

Medal summary

Men

Women

Other events

Men

Women

Open

References

National Track Championships
British National Track Championships